Humphreys & Partners Architects is a Dallas-based architecture firm who has extensive experience in high-rise, mid-rise, student, senior, tax credit, affordable, moderate and luxury communities. Reported in 2017, Humphreys & Partners generated $65,478,872 in multifamily revenue in 2016, and was ranked #1, Top Multifamily Architecture Firms by Building Design + Construction.

History 
Humphreys & Partners Architects was founded in 1991 and established by Mark Humphreys and Greg Faulkner. Headquartered in Dallas, Texas, the company since its inception has now 11 offices in the U.S. and studios in the U.K., Mexico City, Uruguay, India and Vietnam. Delivering 43,000 units annually, Humphreys and Partners Architects have designed over $21 billion in student housing units worldwide as of 2017. In 2017, Humphreys and Partners participated in 25% of all student housing projects in the U.S. and delivered over 20,000 student bedrooms.

Notable Projects 
Built
 The Carlyle, Minneapolis, MN 2009
 The Domain, San Jose, CA 2013
 Hebron 121, Lewisville, Texas 2014-2018
 One Light, Kansas City, MO 2016
 65 Bay Street, Jersey City, NJ 2017
 LVL 29, Plano, Texas 2019

Unbuilt
 Pier 2, Manhattan, NY
 Uber Mega-Skyport, United States of America, Multiple Locations
 Reforma Tower, Mexico City, MX

References

Architecture firms based in Texas
Companies based in Dallas
Design companies established in 1991
1991 establishments in Texas